The Château de Malmaison is a French château situated near the left bank of the Seine, about  west of the centre of Paris, in the commune of Rueil-Malmaison.

Formerly the residence of Empress Joséphine de Beauharnais, along with the Tuileries it was the headquarters of the French government from 1800 to 1802, and Napoleon's last residence in France at the end of the Hundred Days in 1815.

History

Joséphine de Beauharnais bought the manor house in April 1799 for herself and her husband, General Napoléon Bonaparte, the future Napoléon I of France, at that time away fighting the Egyptian Campaign.

Upon his return, Bonaparte expressed fury at Joséphine for purchasing such an expensive house with the money she had expected him to bring back from the Egyptian campaign. The house, for which she had paid well over 300,000 francs, needed extensive renovations; she spent a fortune doing them. However, Malmaison would bring great happiness to the Bonapartes. Joséphine's daughter, Hortense de Beauharnais would call it "a delicious spot".

Joséphine endeavored to transform the large estate into "the most beautiful and curious garden in Europe, a model of good cultivation". She located rare and exotic plants and animals to enhance the gardens. Joséphine wrote: "I wish that Malmaison may soon become the source of riches for all [of France].” In 1800, she built a heated orangery large enough for 300 pineapple plants. Five years later, she ordered the building of a greenhouse, heated by a dozen coal-burning stoves. From 1803 until her death in 1814, Josephine cultivated nearly 200 new plants in France for the first time.

The property achieved enduring fame for its rose garden. Empress Joséphine had the Belgian artist Pierre-Joseph Redouté (1759–1840) record her roses (and lilies), and prints of these works sell quite well, even today. She created an extensive collection of roses, gathering plants from her native Martinique and from other places around the world. She grew some 250 varieties of roses. From the foreword to Jardin de la Malmaison (1803):

Birds and animals of all sorts began to enrich her garden, where they were allowed to roam free among the grounds. At the height of her days at Malmaison, Joséphine had the company of kangaroos, emus, black swans, zebras, sheep, gazelles, ostriches, chamois, a seal, antelopes and llamas to name a few. Some were from the Baudin expedition.

After her divorce from Napoléon, Joséphine received Malmaison in her own right, along with a pension of 5 million francs a year, and remained there until her death in 1814. Napoléon returned and took residence in the house after his defeat at the Battle of Waterloo (1815), before his exile to the island of Saint Helena. After Josephine's death in 1814, the house was vacant at times, the garden and house ransacked and vandalised, and the garden's remains were destroyed in a battle in 1870.

In 1842, Malmaison was purchased by Queen mother Maria Christina, widow of King Ferdinand VII of Spain. She lived there with her second husband Agustín Fernando Muñoz, Duke of Riánsares (made a duke by his step-daughter, Isabella II of Spain, in 1844). In 1861, Maria Christina sold the property to Napoleon III, Josephine's grandson through her daughter Hortense.

Malmaison was fully restored by the famous French architect Pierre Humbert in the early 20th century. It is now considered an important historical monument.

Present times
The public can visit the manor house as a Napoleonic musée national. The museum lies on RN 13 (route nationale 13) from Paris and bus 258 from RER A "Grande Arche" station.

Gallery 
 Exterior 

 Interior

References

External links

Official site
"Josephine's garden", Orient Express Magazine, Vol. 19, No. 1, by HRH Princess Michael of Kent.

Malmaison
Malmaison
Palaces and residences of Napoleon
Malmaison
Malmaison
Biographical museums in France
Museums in Hauts-de-Seine
National museums of France
Napoleon museums
Réunion des Musées Nationaux